Broughton Beck is a village in the South Lakeland district of Cumbria, England. The village has two sections; one part is on the B5281 Ulverston to Gawthwaite Road, the other part of the village is about 250 yards away, to the north. In the past the village served the farms in the surrounding area; there used to be a public house, a shop, a garage, a blacksmith and a mill. The mill building was bequeathed to the village in 1937 and now serves as Broughton Beck Village Hall, known as 'The Mill Room.

References

External links

Villages in Cumbria
South Lakeland District